is the 60th single of the Japanese group Morning Musume. It was released on December 29, 2015.

Background 
"Tsumetai Kaze to Kataomoi / Endless Sky / One and Only" was announced on November 7 during their Morning Musume '15 Concert Tour Aki ~PRISM~ shortly before, 9th Generation member, Sayashi Riho announced her graduation. Hence, this is the last single by the group to feature her.

"One and Only" is the opening theme for NHK WORLD's J-MELO from October 2015 through March 2016 and it is sung completely in English, a first for the group.

Track list speculation quickly rose that Sayashi Riho will have a solo A-Side song and the comeback of a B-Side song, which was last seen on Wagamama Ki no Mama Ai no Joke / Ai no Gundan

Triple A-side speculated track list 
 One and Only
 Watashi no Nanni mo Wakacchanai (Unreleased song from the PRISM tour)
 BRAVE no Kamisama ~Zenshinzenrei~ (Riho Solo)
 Naishobanashi (B-Side)

On December 7, producer Tsunku blogged about the liner notes of the single. He mentioned that "Tsumetai Kaze to Kataomoi" was intended to be the Sayashi Riho solo, but later changed into a group song. For "Endless Sky", it is a song for future members who will decide to graduate and not have regrets on the path they've chosen and look forward to their next challenges in life. On the last part of the blog, he posted the Japanese version of the song "One and Only".

Release details and chart performance
The single was released in six versions: 3 CD-only regular editions and 3 CD+DVD limited editions. The first press regular editions come with a random trading card of 14 kinds depending on the jacket, which is 42 in total. The limited editions instead include an event lottery serial number card.

On December 28, 2015, the single charted on the Top Spot in the Oricon Daily chart. It fluctuated throughout the Oricon Year-end break week from the Top Spot to going as low as the 8th Spot on January 4, 2016. Then on January 5, 2016, Oricon announced that the Single claimed the Top Spot for the first week of 2016 with an estimated sales of 143,000 copies sold.

On February 5, 2016, it was announced that a vinyl version of the single would be released in March as a limited edition webshop item, including a new recording of "Tsumetai Kaze to Kataomoi". On April 1st, it was opened for preorder in standard record shops for a May reprinting.

Members at time of single 
 9th generation: Mizuki Fukumura, Erina Ikuta, Riho Sayashi , Kanon Suzuki
 10th generation: Haruna Iikubo, Ayumi Ishida, Masaki Sato, Haruka Kudo
 11th generation: Sakura Oda
 12th generation: Haruna Ogata, Miki Nonaka, Maria Makino, Akane Haga

Track listings

CD and CD/DVD

Vinyl

References

2015 singles
Zetima Records singles
Japanese-language songs
Morning Musume songs
Oricon Weekly number-one singles
Electropop ballads
Torch songs
2010s ballads